Kotra Pitha is a town and former non-salute princely state on Saurashtra peninsula, in Gujarat, western India.

History 
The Sixth Class princely state, in Sorath prant, was ruled by ભાણ વાળા દાદા વાળા સાહેબ  Kathi. It comprised the town and twelve more villages, with a combined population of 6,772 in 1901, yielding 70,000 Rupees state revenue (1903-4, over half from land), paying 5,578 Rupees tribute, to the British and Junagadh State.

References

External links and sources 
History
 Imperial Gazetteer, on DSAL.UChicago.edu - Kathiawar

Princely states of Gujarat